John Walker (born April 21, 1956) is an American film producer and actor. He produced Disney-Pixar's The Incredibles (2004).

Walker graduated at the University of Notre Dame, and studied theatre education at American Conservatory Theater in San Francisco. He served as managing director of Victory Gardens Theater, where he produced over 30 new plays.

Walker is also the vice president of Ghost Ranch Productions, a non-profit corporation committed to producing a wide variety of exceptional plays, musicals, and films.

He is married to Pamela Gaye Walker, president of Ghost Ranch Productions. As of 2015, they have acted together in 25 shows.

Filmography

References

External links

www.ghostranchproductions.com/

1956 births
Living people
American animated film producers
American film producers
Pixar people
Place of birth missing (living people)